Lee–Van Aken is a station on the RTA Blue Line in Shaker Heights, Ohio, located at the intersection of Lee Road and Van Aken Boulevard.

History
The station opened on April 11, 1920 with the initiation of rail service by the Cleveland Interurban Railroad on what is now Van Aken Boulevard from Lynnfield Road to Shaker Square and then to East 34th Street and via surface streets to downtown. The underpass at Lee Road was dictated by an existing creekbed at the site. It is the only grade separation on the Van Aken line.

In 1980 and 1981, the Green and Blue Lines were completely renovated with new track, ballast, poles and wiring, and new stations were built along the line. The renovated line along Van Aken Boulevard opened on October 30, 1981.

In March 2008, architects were selected to design a new station to replace the existing structure. The new, ADA-compliant station, includes elevators, a larger pedestrian/bus interface point and enhanced safety and security systems. Public art titled "
Railway Dream" by American Sculptor Rachel Slick was commissioned for street level entries and East and West bound platforms. Construction began on June 25, 2014, and the rebuilt station opened in December, 2015.

Station layout
Unlike most other stations served exclusively by the Blue Line, this station is located in a cut within the median of Van Aken Boulevard just west of the Lee Road overpass. Concrete stairways with canopies and elevators lead from Lee Road down to two side platforms.

Gallery

Notable places nearby
 Shaker Heights Public Library

References

External links

Blue Line (RTA Rapid Transit)
Railway stations in the United States opened in 1920
1920 establishments in Ohio